17-AR may refer to:
17-AR, a fictional star system in Wing Commander: Privateer
17 år, a single by Swedish singer Veronica Maggio